Stanislav Tyshchenko (born 26 December 1974) is a Ukrainian professional football manager and former player; he also holds Russian citizenship.

External links

1974 births
Living people
Russian footballers
Ukrainian footballers
Ukrainian football managers
Association football goalkeepers
Ukrainian expatriate footballers
Expatriate footballers in Belarus
Expatriate footballers in Russia
Expatriate footballers in Kazakhstan
Russian expatriate sportspeople in Kazakhstan
FC Shakhtar-2 Donetsk players
FC Metalurh Kostiantynivka players
FC Volyn Lutsk players
FC Metalurh Donetsk players
FC Shakhtar Stakhanov players
FC Molodechno players
FC Ordabasy players
FC Caspiy players
FC Nyva Vinnytsia players
FC Elektrometalurh-NZF Nikopol players
PFC Spartak Nalchik players
FC Volgar Astrakhan players
FC Yenisey Krasnoyarsk players
FC Dynamo Stavropol players
FC Avangard Kursk players
Ukrainian Premier League players
Ukrainian First League players
Belarusian Premier League players
Kazakhstan Premier League players
FC Mashuk-KMV Pyatigorsk players